Melissa Sue Glynn is an American consultant and government official who served between 2018 and 2021 as the Assistant Secretary of Veterans Affairs for Enterprise Integration. Prior to assuming her current role, she led Alvarez and Marsal's public sector practice focused on improving the delivery of government programs and K-12 and higher education. Previously, she was a principal with PricewaterhouseCoopers, where she was responsible for the firm's work with the United States Department of Veterans Affairs.

Glynn holds a B.A. from Rutgers University and an M.A. and Ph.D. from the University of Arizona. While working toward her doctorate, she served as co-director of the Center for the Management of Information at the University of Arizona. She was also a principal investigator on a cooperative grant from the National Science Foundation and several programs funded by defense research laboratories.

References

Living people
Rutgers University alumni
University of Arizona alumni
Trump administration personnel
Year of birth missing (living people)
United States Department of Veterans Affairs officials